Nong Prue is a tambon (subdistrict) of Bang Phli District, in Samut Prakan Province, Thailand. In 2017 it had a total population of 2,719 people.

Administration

Central administration
The tambon is subdivided into 3 administrative villages (muban).

Local administration
The whole area of the subdistrict is covered by the subdistrict administrative organization (SAO) Nong Prue (องค์การบริหารส่วนตำบลหนองปรือ).

References

External links
Thaitambon.com on Nong Prue

Tambon of Samut Prakan Province